William G. Biggart (July 20, 1947 – September 11, 2001) was an American freelance photojournalist and a victim of the September 11 attacks, notable for his street-view photographs of the event before being killed by the collapse of the World Trade Center's North Tower. He was the only professional photographer to be killed while covering the attacks.

On September 15, 2001, four days after the attacks, Biggart's remains were discovered along with a bag containing his three cameras and the CompactFlash card from which his last photographs were recovered. The photos were used in the October 15, 2001 issue of Newsweek. His photographs from 9/11 were exhibited at the International Center of Photography and the Smithsonian's National Museum of American History. They have also been preserved on the Internet by The Digital Journalist.

Personal life
A child of an American officer stationed in Germany, Bill Biggart was born in Berlin in 1947. Biggart was one of 12 siblings in his Irish-Catholic family. As an adult, he moved into a loft in Lower Manhattan, New York City, about the same time that the WTC was opening in the 1970s.

Biggart was married twice and had three children. He had one son from his first marriage. Biggart's second wife was Wendy Doremus, and they had two children.

Career
Biggart started out as a commercial photographer and he soon began to pursue an interest in spot news photography. He was at Wounded Knee to photograph the 1973 incident. He would also sometimes take jobs for theater productions. With a passion for news, he transitioned to photojournalism in 1985. His photojournalism credits are found in the international stories he covered in the West Bank and Israel in 1988, Northern Ireland, and the first Gulf War. He was also frequently credited for photographs that captured news events closer to his home in New York City, such as a NYC subway shot of "subway vigilante" Bernhard Goetz, Howard Beach, or the 1989 funeral of Yusuf Hawkins. He was also present in Berlin to photograph the fall of the Berlin Wall in November 1989.

Biggart began working for the Impact Visuals photo news agency in 1988 and he continued to work there until he was killed. He also worked as a freelance photographer for Reuters, Agence France Press, and Sipa Press. His work appeared in The New York Times, The Christian Science Monitor, The Village Voice and The City Sun.

September 11 attacks

On the morning of September 11, 2001, a passing taxi driver alerted Biggart to the fact that a plane had just crashed into the World Trade Center. A "news junkie", according to those who were close to him, Biggart ran to his apartment near Union Square, grabbed three cameras (two film, one digital) and began walking the two miles toward the center, where fire trucks were located, shooting photographs along the way, including digital, color film and slide images. He eventually found himself at the World Trade Center shooting the Twin Towers as they burned, and continued taking photos after the South Tower collapsed. His wife called Biggart on his cell phone shortly after the first tower's collapse. According to her, Biggart said he was with the firemen and safe, and he would meet her in 20 minutes.

Another photographer, Bolivar Arellano of the New York Post, observed that Biggart was photographing the second tower before it fell, and that Biggart was closer than any other photographer, and closer than Arellano felt was safe. Bill Biggart took his last photo at 10:28:24 am EST, about 20 minutes after his phone call with his wife. At 10:28 am, the North Tower collapsed. Falling debris from the tower killed him. His last photograph was presented as a highlight of the 2002 exhibit at the National Museum of American History. In the days following the tower's collapse, Biggart was reported among the missing. His wife searched for him at news agencies and hospitals. Four days later, his remains and camera equipment were recovered from the tower debris.

Biggart took over 300 photographs of the event, 154 of which Biggart's friend, photographer Chip East, was able to recover from Biggart's digital storage devices, and which have become part of the exhibits of Biggart's most well-known photographs.

Memorials
Biggart's name was added to The Freedom Forum Journalists Memorial at the Newseum in Washington, D.C., in 2001.
At the National September 11 Memorial & Museum, Biggart is memorialized at the South Pool, on Panel S-66.

Creative works
 Ireland: A Week in the Life of A Nation (1986 U.K.)
 Running Towards Danger: Stories Behind the Breaking News of 9/11 (2002, Newseum)

Exhibits
Aftermath: Reflections on The Anniversary of September 11, Bill Biggart: Final Exposures, International Center of Photography, New York City, 2002.
Bearing Witness to History, Smithsonian's National Museum of American History, Washington, D.C., 2002.
Bill Biggart's cameras from 9/11 are on display at the Newseum in Washington, D.C., April 11, 2008.

See also
List of journalists killed in the United States
List of solved missing person cases

References

External links

DigitalJournalist
The Freedom Forum Journalists Memorial

1947 births
2000s missing person cases
2001 deaths
American expatriates in Germany
American people of Irish descent
American photojournalists
American terrorism victims
Filmed killings
Formerly missing people
Journalists killed in the United States
Journalists who died as a result of terrorism
Male murder victims
Missing person cases in New York City
People murdered in New York City
Terrorism deaths in New York (state)
Victims of the September 11 attacks